The Slovenia women's national volleyball team represents Slovenia in international women's volleyball competitions and friendly matches.

Results

European Championship
2015 – 16th place
2019 – 16th place
2023 – Qualified

European League
2014 – 7th place
2016 –  Bronze Medal
2019 – 14th place
2020 – cancelled
2021 – 14th place
2022 – 12th place

Team

Current squad
The following is the Slovenia roster for the 2015 Women's European Volleyball Championship.

Head coach: Bruno Najdič

References

External links
Official website
FIVB profile

National women's volleyball teams
Volleyball women
Volleyball in Slovenia